The 2019 Tuvalu A-Division was the 19th season of top flight association football in Tuvalu. The season started and finish on 2019.

Participating Clubs
The 2019 edition of the A-Division was played between 9 teams:

Lakena United     (Nanumea)
FC Manu Laeva        (Nukulaelae)
Nauti FC A1          (Funafuti) 
Nauti FC A2          (Funafuti) 
FC Niutao            (Niutao)
Tamanuku          (Nukufetau)
FC Tofaga A1         (Vaitupu) 
FC Tofaga A2         (Vaitupu) 
Vaoloa FC            (Nui)

Classification Final

 1.Nauti A1            7   6  0  1  46- 8  18 Champions
 ------------------------------------------------------
 2.Tofaga A1           7   5  1  1  26- 5  16
 3.Manu Laeva          7   4  2  1  29-12  14
 4.Tamanuku            7   4  2  1  20-14  14
 5.Lakena United       7   2  3  2  25-21   9
 6.Vaoloa              7   2  2  3  15-18   8
 7.Niutao              7   2  1  4  22-25   7
 8.Nauti A2            7   1  1  5  11-42   4
 9.Tofaga A2           8   0  0  8   6-55   0

Champions
In the 2019 edition of the Tuvalu A-Division, the main Nauti FC team was delighted to win the competition after two seasons.

References

External links 
 tnfa.tv
 vriendenvantuvalu.nl 
 soccerway.com

Tuvalu A-Division seasons